UFC on Fox: Poirier vs. Gaethje (also known as UFC on FOX 29) was a mixed martial arts event produced by the Ultimate Fighting Championship that was held on April 14, 2018, at the Gila River Arena in Glendale, Arizona.

Background
After previously contesting two events at nearby Talking Stick Resort Arena in Phoenix, the event was the first that the promotion held in Glendale. Zuffa had previously hosted the final World Extreme Cagefighting event, WEC 53 at the arena in December 2010.

The event was headlined by a lightweight bout between Dustin Poirier and former WSOF Lightweight Champion Justin Gaethje.

A lightweight bout between Gilbert Burns and Lando Vannata was linked to the event. However, the pairing never materialized as Vannata was unable to accept the fight for this date as he was still rehabilitating a recent arm injury.

Abdul Razak Alhassan was scheduled to face Muslim Salikhov at the event. However, Alhassan was removed from the event, citing injury and was replaced by promotional newcomer Ricky Rainey.

A welterweight bout between former WEC Welterweight Champion and interim UFC Welterweight Champion Carlos Condit and Matt Brown was supposed take place as the co-headliner. However, on April 2, Brown pulled out of the fight due to a torn anterior cruciate ligament and was replaced by Alex Oliveira.

Results

Bonus awards
The following fighters were awarded $50,000 bonuses:
Fight of the Night: Dustin Poirier vs. Justin Gaethje
Performance of the Night: Alex Oliveira and Adam Wieczorek

Reported payout
The following is the reported payout to the fighters as reported to the Arizona Boxing and MMA Commission. It does not include sponsor money and also does not include the UFC's traditional "fight night" bonuses. The total disclosed payout for the event was $1,481,000.

 Dustin Poirier: $170,000 (includes $85,000 win bonus) def. Justin Gaethje: $110,000
 Alex Oliveira: $100,000 (includes $50,000 win bonus) def. Carlos Condit: $115,000 
 Israel Adesanya: $106,000 (includes $53,000 win bonus) def. Marvin Vettori: $20,000
 Michelle Waterson: $80,000 (includes $40,000 win bonus) def. Cortney Casey: $33,000
 Antônio Carlos Júnior: $80,000 (includes $40,000 win bonus) def. Tim Boetsch: $72,000
 Muslim Salikhov: $20,000 (includes $10,000 win bonus) def. Rickey Rainey: $12,000
 John Moraga: $74,000 (includes $37,000 win bonus) def. Wilson Reis: $31,000
 Brad Tavares: $80,000 (includes $40,000 win bonus) def. Krzysztof Jotko : $36,000
 Gilbert Burns: $56,000 (includes $28,000 win bonus) def. Dan Moret: $12,000
 Lauren Mueller: $20,000 (includes $10,000 win bonus) def. Shana Dobson: $12,000
 Yushin Okami: $70,000 (includes $35,000 win bonus) def. Dhiego Lima: $15,000
 Adam Wieczorek: $24,000 (includes $12,000 win bonus) def. Arjan Bhullar: $12,000
 Alejandro Pérez: $50,000 (includes $25,000 win bonus) def. Matthew Lopez: $33,000
 Luke Sanders: $24,000 (includes $12,000 win bonus) def. Patrick Williams: $12,000

See also

List of UFC events
List of current UFC fighters
2018 in UFC

References

Fox UFC
Mixed martial arts in Arizona
Sports in Glendale, Arizona
2018 in mixed martial arts
Events in Glendale, Arizona
Sports competitions in Maricopa County, Arizona